South Willard is a census-designated place (CDP) in Box Elder County, Utah, United States. The population was 1,571 at the 2010 census.

Geography
According to the United States Census Bureau, the CDP has a total area of 5.8 square miles (15.1 km2), all land.

Demographics

As of the census of 2000, there were 586 people, 209 households, and 156 families residing in the CDP. The population density was 100.6 people per square mile (38.9/km2). There were 228 housing units at an average density of 39.2/sq mi (15.1/km2). The racial makeup of the CDP was 95.22% White, 1.19% Native American, 0.17% Asian, 1.87% from other races, and 1.54% from two or more races. Hispanic or Latino of any race were 5.12% of the population.

There were 209 households, out of which 39.2% had children under the age of 18 living with them, 66.5% were married couples living together, 6.7% had a female householder with no husband present, and 24.9% were non-families. 23.0% of all households were made up of individuals, and 7.7% had someone living alone who was 65 years of age or older. The average household size was 2.80 and the average family size was 3.34.

In the CDP, the population was spread out, with 29.0% under the age of 18, 12.3% from 18 to 24, 29.4% from 25 to 44, 17.4% from 45 to 64, and 11.9% who were 65 years of age or older. The median age was 31 years. For every 100 females, there were 104.2 males. For every 100 females age 18 and over, there were 104.9 males.

The median income for a household in the CDP was $43,214, and the median income for a family was $45,000. Males had a median income of $36,607 versus $20,938 for females. The per capita income for the CDP was $16,560. About 9.5% of families and 7.4% of the population were below the poverty line, including 8.2% of those under age 18 and 3.1% of those age 65 or over.

See also

 List of census-designated places in Utah

References

External links

Census-designated places in Box Elder County, Utah
Census-designated places in Utah